Dagne Alemu (born 15 October 1980 in Shoa) is an Ethiopian long-distance runner, who specializes in cross-country running.

International competitions

External links
 (old version)

1980 births
Living people
Ethiopian male long-distance runners
Athletes (track and field) at the 2000 Summer Olympics
Olympic athletes of Ethiopia
Ethiopian male cross country runners
21st-century Ethiopian people